One Piece (stylized in all caps) is a Japanese anime television series produced by Toei Animation that premiered on Fuji TV in October 1999. It is based on Eiichiro Oda's manga series of the same name. The story follows the adventures of Monkey D. Luffy, a boy whose body gained the properties of rubber after unintentionally eating a Devil Fruit. With his crew of pirates, named the Straw Hat Pirates, Luffy explores the Grand Line in search of the world's ultimate treasure known as "One Piece" in order to become the next Pirate King.

Since its premiere in Japan, over 1000 episodes have been aired, and later exported to various countries around the world.

Series overview

Voice cast and characters

Production

English localization and broadcasting
On June 8, 2004, 4Kids Entertainment acquired the license for distribution of One Piece in North America; 4Kids contracted Viz Media to handle home video distribution. 4Kids' in-house musicians wrote a new background score and theme song nicknamed "Pirate Rap". 4Kids' dub mandated edits for content and length, which reduced the first 143 episodes into 104. Initially, 4Kids originally created an English version of the first opening theme, "We Are!" by Russell Velazquez. It premiered in the United States on September 18, 2004 on the Fox network as part of the weekend programming block FoxBox TV, and later aired on Cartoon Network on their Saturday night action programming block, Toonami in April 2005. It also aired in other blocks and line-ups, such as its Monday-Thursday night prime-time line-up and its Miguzi weekday after-school action block in 2006. Production was halted in 2006 after episode 143/104; Viz also ceased its home video release of the series after volume 11. On July 22, 2010, an interview with Anime News Network and Mark Kirk, senior vice-president of digital media for 4Kids Entertainment, revealed that 4Kids acquired One Piece as part of a package deal with other anime, and that the company did not screen the series before licensing it. However, once 4Kids realized One Piece was not appropriate for their intended demographic, the company decided to edit it into a more child-oriented series until they had an opportunity to legally drop the license. Kirk said the experience of producing One Piece "ruined the company's reputation". Since then, 4Kids established a stricter set of guidelines, checks, and balances to determine which anime the company acquires.

On April 13, 2007, Funimation (now Crunchyroll, LLC) licensed the series and started production on an English-language release of One Piece which also included redubbing the episodes previously dubbed by 4Kids. In an interview with voice actor Christopher Sabat, he stated that Funimation had been interested in acquiring One Piece from the very beginning, and produced a "test episode," in which Sabat portrayed the character of Helmeppo and Eric Vale played the part of the main character, Monkey D. Luffy. (They would later go on to provide the English voices for Roronoa Zoro and Sanji, respectively.) After resuming production of the renewed English dub, which featured less censorship because of fewer restrictions on cable programming, Funimation released its first uncut, bilingual DVD box set containing 13 episodes on May 27, 2008, similarly sized sets followed with fourteen sets released. The Funimation-dubbed episodes premiered on Cartoon Network on September 29, 2007 and aired until its removal on March 22, 2008. On October 28, 2011, Funimation posted a press release on their official website confirming the acquisition of episodes 206–263, and the aspect ratio, beginning with episode 207, would be changed to the 16:9 widescreen format. On May 18, 2013, the uncut series began airing on Adult Swim's revived Toonami late-night programming block from episode 207 onward. One Piece was removed from the Toonami block after March 18, 2017. The series returned to Toonami, starting from 517, on January 22, 2022.

In May 2009, Funimation, Toei Animation, Shueisha, and Fuji TV announced they would simulcast stream the series within an hour of the weekly Japanese broadcast at no charge. Originally scheduled to begin on May 30, 2009, with episode 403, a lack of security resulted in a leak of the episode, and Funimation delayed the offer until episode 415 on August 29, 2009.

On February 12, 2013, it was announced that Manga Entertainment would start releasing the Funimation dub of One Piece in the United Kingdom in a DVD box set format. Crunchyroll began simulcasting the series on November 2, 2013, for the United States, Canada, South Africa, Australia, New Zealand, and Latin America. Crunchyroll later expanded access to the United Kingdom and Ireland, as well as a majority of European territories, on February 22, 2020. In April 2020, Netflix officially announced that they would be streaming One Piece starting on June 12 of the same year, for the United States, Canada, Australia, and New Zealand.

Films
15 animated theatrical films based on the One Piece series have been released in Japan. The films are typically released in March in accordance with the spring vacation of Japanese schools. The films feature self-contained, completely original plots, or alternate retellings of story arcs with animation of a higher quality than what the weekly anime allows. The first three films were typically double features paired up with other anime films, and were thus, usually an hour or less in length. Funimation has licensed the eighth, tenth, twelfth, thirteenth, and fourteenth films for release in North America, and these films have received in-house dubs by the company.

Television specials
The One Piece franchise has spawned 13 television specials that aired on Fuji TV. Of these specials, the first four, as well as the sixth, eighth, ninth, and eleventh are original stories created by the anime staff with the exception of the fifth, seventh, tenth, twelfth, and thirteenth specials, which are alternate re-tellings of certain story arcs.

OVAs

Shorts

Music

Music soundtracks have been released that are based on songs that premiered in the series. Kohei Tanaka and Shiro Hamaguchi composed the score for One Piece. Various theme songs and character songs were released.

The anime television series consists of 42 pieces of theme music: 24 opening themes and 18 ending themes. As of episode 279, ending themes were omitted and, starting from episode 326 onwards, opening themes were extended from 110 seconds long to 150 seconds long. In episodes 1-206 of Funimation's English-language release of the series, the opening and ending themes were dubbed into English by various voice actors, before reverting to the Japanese versions from episodes 207 onwards and some openings were not licensed by Funimation's release at the time, which is also affected by all territories.

On August 11, 2019, it was announced that Sakuramen, a musical group will be collaborating with Kohei Tanaka to compose music for the anime's 20th season.

Opening theme

Alternates
 "One Piece Rap" (4Kids)
 Version 1: (Episodes 1-29)
 Version 2: (Episodes 30-59) (inclusion of Sanji and Usopp in the lyrics)
 Version 3: (Episodes 60-104) (inclusion of Chopper in the lyrics)

Ending theme

Other music
On December 23, 2019, a teaser video was uploaded on Arashi's YouTube channel, in collaboration with the anime. The 39-second video for the song A-ra-shi: Reborn, has the 5 animated members of the band mingling with the crew from the anime, up until the moment when Arashi is about to give a concert. The full version video was released on January 4, 2020.

Reception

Ratings
The anime has been very well-received. The first episode of the anime adaptation earned a viewer rating of 12.4%, behind Pokémon and ahead of Ojamajo Doremi. In Japan, One Piece has consistently been among the top five animated shows in television viewer ratings, .

On international online video platforms, the One Piece anime got 1.9 million demand expressions per month in 2016, making it the year's most popular anime and fourteenth most popular TV show in the world, according to Business Insider. In the United States, where it is available on the Hulu streaming platform, One Piece was 2018's most binge-watched television show in the states of Illinois and Wisconsin.

In 2022, One Piece was the most watched TV show of the year in the world, beating Stranger Things and Monkey D. Luffy was ranked as top three world's most popular character according to TV Time, a popular tracking service.

Sales and revenue
On numerous occasions, the One Piece anime has topped Japan's DVD sales charts.

The following table lists the annual content revenue from One Piece media in Japan, as reported by market research firm Hakuhodo.

The following table lists Toei Animation's net earnings from One Piece anime home media, including domestic and overseas licensing as well as overseas sales, between 2003 and 2019. It does not include sales or earnings from domestic or overseas licensee companies, such as Fuji TV in Japan or Toonami in North America, for example, but only includes Toei Animation's earnings as an anime licensor and overseas distributor.

Critical reception
In a review of the second DVD release of 4Kids Entertainment's dub, Todd Douglass, Jr. of DVD Talk called its adaptation a "shabby treatment" resulting in an "arguably less enjoyable rendition". Douglass said that the 4Kids original opening was "a crappy rap song" and that the removal of whole scenes leaves a "feeling that something is missing". He later went on to say that "Fans of the 'real' One Piece will want to skip picking [...] up [4Kids Entertainment's One Piece DVDs] until an uncut release is announced", and also stated that "kids may get into this version because it's what they have seen on TV". Margaret Veira of activeAnime praised the TV series' "great" animation, stating that "It gives life and stays true to the style and characters of the manga." She notes the fight scenes in particular have "a lot of energy to them". Patrick King of Animefringe comments that the art style of One Piece is "very distinctive and fresh".

In a review of the first Funimation DVD release for Mania Entertainment, Bryce Coulter comments that One Piece is "not your typical pirate adventure" and that mixed with "the right amount of random fun along with a shonen style storyline" it becomes "an appealing and fun romp". In a review of Funimation's second DVD release for Mania Entertainment, Bryce Coulter comments that "You can tell that they are giving One Piece the attention that was neglected by 4Kids" and that "One Piece is a great tale of high-seas fun that will leave you wanting more!"

In Indonesia, Global TV was reprimanded by the Indonesian Broadcasting Commission (KPI) for airing the anime television series. Nina Armando, member of the KPI and a lecturer at the University of Indonesia, said the show should not be aired at times when children are likely to watch.

Awards and accolades
The first opening of the One Piece anime television series, "We Are!", won the Animation Kobe Theme Song Award of the year 2000. In February 2001, One Piece placed 9th among anime television series in Japan. In 2001, the readers of Animage, a popular Japanese anime magazine, voted the anime television series in 5th place of The Readers' Picks for the Anime that should be remembered in the 21st Century. In June 2002, Animage readers voted One Piece to be the 16th best new anime of the year 2001, and gave it another 16th place in 2004 in the category Favorite Anime Series. In a 2005 web poll by Japanese television network TV Asahi One Piece was voted 6th most popular animated TV series. Before the poll, Asahi TV broadcast another list based on a nationwide survey in which One Piece placed 4th among teenagers. In 2006, it was elected 32nd of the Top 100 Japanese anime by TV Asahi and 21st by its viewers. Funimation's first DVD release of the series "One Piece: Season 1 First Voyage" was nominated for the Fifth Annual TV DVD Awards.

See also
 List of One Piece media

Notes

References

External links

 One Piece official website 
 Official anime website of Crunchyroll, LLC

  at Adult Swim
 

One Piece mass media
1999 anime television series debuts
Anime series based on manga
Adventure anime and manga
Asia Television
Crunchyroll anime
Fantasy anime and manga
Fuji TV original programming
Funimation
Odex
Television series about pirates
Toei Animation original video animation
Toei Animation television
Toonami
Viz Media anime
Television censorship in the United States